Binay Krishna Barman is an Indian Politician from the state of West Bengal. He is a two term member of the West Bengal Legislative Assembly. He is chairman of All India Trinamool Congress Coochbehar District (2019-).

MLA from Mathabhanga constituency
He served as the Member in the West Bengal Legislative Assembly (MLA) representing the Mathabhanga (Vidhan Sabha constituency) from 2011. He is from the All India Trinamool Congress.

References

External links 
Member's List West Bengal Legislative Assembly

 
 

 

 

West Bengal MLAs 2011–2016
West Bengal MLAs 2016–2021
Living people
Trinamool Congress politicians from West Bengal
Year of birth missing (living people)
Place of birth missing (living people)